Varash Raion is a raion (district) of Rivne Oblast, Ukraine. It was created in July 2020 as part of the reform of administrative divisions of Ukraine. The center of the raion is the city of Varash. Population:

References

Raions of Rivne Oblast
Ukrainian raions established during the 2020 administrative reform